The Boridae are a small family of tenebrionoid beetles with no vernacular common name, though recent authors have coined the name conifer bark beetles. The family contains three genera. Boros is native to North America and northern Eurasia, Lecontia is endemic to North America, while Synercticus is found in Australia and New Guinea. The larvae of Boros are found under bark and are especially associated with standing dead trees (snags), typically pines, found in old-growth forests. Lecontia larvae are found inhabiting damp parts of the root system of dead standing trees. Little is known of the life habits of Synercticus.

Taxonomy
 Genus Boros Herbst, 1797
 Boros schneideri (Panzer, 1795)
 Boros unicolor Say, 1827
 Genus Lecontia Champion, 1889
 Lecontia discicollis LeConte, 1850
 Genus Synercticus Newman, 1842
 Synercticus heteromerus Newman, 1842

References

External links 
 Boridae Species List at Joel Hallan's Biology Catalog. Texas A&M University. Retrieved on 15 Jul 2011.

Tenebrionoidea
Beetle families